Jose Eugenio Ellauri y Obes (1834–1894) was a Uruguayan political figure.

Background

He was a lawyer by profession, and a prominent member of the Colorado Party (Uruguay).

His father was Foreign Minister, Deputy and President of the Constituent Assembly, José Longinos Ellauri.

He served as Foreign Minister under Lorenzo Batlle y Grau from 1868 to 1872.

President of Uruguay

He served as  President of Uruguay from 1873 to 1875.

While President, Ellauri founded by decree the town of Villa del Carmen, in Durazno Department in 1873.

See also

 Politics of Uruguay
 List of political families#Uruguay
 Colorado Party (Uruguay)#Earlier History
 Villa del Carmen#History

References
 :es:José Eugenio Ellauri

1834 births
1894 deaths
Presidents of Uruguay
Colorado Party (Uruguay) politicians
Foreign ministers of Uruguay
19th-century Uruguayan lawyers